Chionodes periculella is a moth in the family Gelechiidae. It is found in North America, where it has been recorded from British Columbia, Washington, California and Oregon.

The wingspan is about 22 mm. The forewings are brownish black with a purple sheen and with a few scattered white scales. At apical fourth is a white zigzag line. The hindwings are dark fuscous.

The larvae feed on Pinus ponderosa and Pseudotsuga menziesii.

References

Chionodes
Moths described in 1910
Moths of North America